Rick "Rico" Roberts (born December 8, 1967 in Vancouver, British Columbia) is a former field hockey defender from Canada.

Roberts started playing hockey in Victoria at age thirteen. He is married to former Women's National Team player Lisa Faust. Also commonly referred to as "The Hammer". He cowrote "The Goose is in Malaysia" theme song of the Men's National Team at the 1998 Commonwealth Games with David Yule.

Roberts is currently a teacher at St. Georges Senior School in Vancouver, British Columbia, Canada. He teaches English and coaches the school's field hockey team. "Hammer" Rico is also an accomplished 12-stringer guitar player and singer.

International senior competitions
 1989 – International Student Games, Sheffield
 1993 – World Cup Qualifier, Poznan (7th)
 1995 – Pan American Games, Mar del Plata (2nd)
 1996 – Olympic Qualifier, Barcelona (6th)
 1996 – World Cup Preliminary, Sardinia (2nd)
 1997 – World Cup Qualifier, Kuala Lumpur (5th)
 1998 – World Cup, Utrecht (8th)
 1998 – Commonwealth Games, Kuala Lumpur (not ranked)
 1999 – Sultan Azlan Shah Cup, Kuala Lumpur (4th)
 1999 – Pan American Games, Winnipeg (1st)
 2000 – Americas Cup, Cuba (2nd)
 2000 – Sultan Azlan Shah Cup, Kuala Lumpur (7th)
 2000 – Olympic Games, Sydney (10th)
 2001 – World Cup Qualifier, Edinburgh (8th)
 2002 – Commonwealth Games, Manchester (6th)

References
 Profile at Field Hockey Canada. Retrieved 25.10.2012

1967 births
Living people
Field hockey players from Vancouver
Canadian male field hockey players
Field hockey players at the 2000 Summer Olympics
Olympic field hockey players of Canada
Pan American Games gold medalists for Canada
Pan American Games silver medalists for Canada
Pan American Games medalists in field hockey
1998 Men's Hockey World Cup players
Male field hockey defenders
Field hockey players at the 1995 Pan American Games
Field hockey players at the 1999 Pan American Games
Medalists at the 1995 Pan American Games
Medalists at the 1999 Pan American Games
Field hockey players at the 1998 Commonwealth Games
Field hockey players at the 2002 Commonwealth Games
Commonwealth Games competitors for Canada